The Dust Brothers are a pair of songwriters and producers consisting of E.Z. Mike (Michael Simpson) and King Gizmo (John King). They are famous for the sample-based music they produced in the 1980s and 1990s, and specifically for their work on the albums Paul's Boutique by the Beastie Boys, Odelay, Midnite Vultures and Guero by Beck, the soundtrack to the film Fight Club, and "MMMBop" by Hanson. They are based in Los Angeles, California.

History

1980s
Michael "E.Z." Simpson and John "Gizmo" King started working together as the Dust Brothers in 1985 at Pomona College radio station, KSPC, hosting a weekly hip-hop show called The Big Beat Showcase.

They developed writing and producing skills creating music for their show and DJing and rapping at parties. In 1987, they began writing and producing for the Delicious Vinyl label. There they wrote and produced tracks on Tone Lōc's album, Lōc-ed After Dark, Young MC's debut album Stone Cold Rhymin', and other Delicious Vinyl releases. They also worked with the Boo Yaa Tribe on the album New Funky Nation, producing several songs on that album.

Adam Horovitz of the Beastie Boys stopped by mutual friend Matt Dike's apartment, where King and Dike slyly played music intended to be a Dust Brothers album. Horovitz liked what he heard and asked if he could buy the music. The Dust Brothers along with Dike ended up co-writing, producing and mixing the Beastie Boys' second album, Paul's Boutique, considered one of the best albums of all time by Time in 2006.

1990s
Beck had the Dust Brothers produce his album Odelay, released in 1996. The album spawned the hits "Where It's At" (#64 on the Hot 100), "Devils Haircut" (#94 on the Hot 100), "The New Pollution" (#74) and "Jack-Ass" (#73). In 1995 the Dust Brothers co-produced Mötley Crüe frontman Vince Neil's second solo album Carved in Stone.

In 1997, they produced a track with Korn called "Kick the P.A." for the Spawn soundtrack; produced the number one hit "MMMBop" for Hanson's first major label album Middle of Nowhere; and created a song on the #1 soundtrack to the Howard Stern film Private Parts named "Tortured Man", featuring vocals by Stern. The Dust Brothers also co-produced three songs on the Rolling Stones album, Bridges to Babylon.

The next year, the duo were approached by director David Fincher to assemble the score for the film Fight Club, most notably "This Is Your Life", a song featuring lines from the film, including a monologue by the character Tyler Durden (Brad Pitt). The same year also saw the Dust Brothers collaborate with Jeymes Samuel aka the Bullitts on the soundtrack for the film Muppets from Space, recording a cover version of the Earth, Wind & Fire song "Shining Star".

In 1999, the two collaborated with Carlos Santana and Eagle-Eye Cherry on Santana's multi-platinum album Supernatural. They received their first Grammy for 'Album of the Year'; after having received numerous nominations for their past work with Beck and as artists for their instrumental song on the X-Files soundtrack. They also recorded, produced and mixed an album by 'hip pop' group 10 Cents named Buggin Out.

2000s
In the Aughts, the Dust Brothers had continued success, again collaborating with Beck on the album Guero; Tenacious D on their self-titled debut; Linkin Park with a track called "With You" on their first studio album Hybrid Theory; remixing the Styles of Beyond track "Winnetka Exit" on their promotional CD Spies Like Us; and producing the They Might Be Giants album The Else.

Controversy with the Chemical Brothers
The Dust Brothers name and trademark was used by the British duo that eventually became the Chemical Brothers as they began their career. Used as a homage to the American group, they changed their name when they were unable to convince the Dust Brothers to sell the name. Eventually the groups reached an understanding, and the Chemical Brothers' 1997 EP Elektrobank featured a Dust Brothers remix of the title track.

References

External links
Official website
At Discogs
Mike Simpson's Official Website

Record producers from California
Ableton Live users
Beastie Boys
Record production duos
Grammy Award winners
American musical duos
Musical groups established in 1985
1985 establishments in California